Bernardus Accama (1697–1756) was an 18th-century Dutch historical and portrait painter.

He was born in Friesland, possibly in Burum, the son of Aeltje Boetes Nievelt and Simon Accama, the local church minister. He was christened on July 12, 1697 at Burum. He lived much of his life in Leeuwarden. He worked for and executed commissions for William IV, Prince of Orange. However, much of his work was lost during the Revolution of 1795. He was the brother and instructor of the painter Matthijs Accama.

References

 Bernard Accama (ca. 1697–1756), portraitist of the Frisian elite; Heerenveen: Museum Willem van Haren; 1989

External links

1697 births
1756 deaths
18th-century Dutch painters
18th-century Dutch male artists
Dutch male painters
History painters
Dutch portrait painters
People from Kollumerland
People from Leeuwarden
Frisian painters